The UAAP Basketball Championship holds its basketball tournaments from September to December. Basketball is a mandatory sport in the University Athletic Association of the Philippines (UAAP). All eight universities participate in the Men's, Women's, and Juniors (Boys') tournaments.

The tournament is divided into two divisions, the Seniors' division, which is further subdivided into the Men's tournament, for male collegiate players, and the Women's tournament for female collegiate players. The other division is the Juniors' which is also subdivided into two tournaments for the male and female high school athletes.

The UAAP basketball sport has a rich history of schools establishing dynasties. UE won a record seven consecutive basketball titles from 1965 to 1971 albeit the third one was a shared championship with UST. Ateneo had a 5-year winning streak from 2008 to 2012. Two other schools ended their championship streak at four. UST won it from 1993 to 1996 and La Salle from 1998 to 2001.

The championship in basketball is the most coveted title that schools aspire for during a UAAP season and is one of the most anticipated live TV sporting events in the Philippines, but such aspirations have resulted in many controversies in the association. There are protests filed by the member-schools against one another almost every season. Ironically, the association has a handbook of its rules and regulations.

Tournament format

Pre-first expansion format
Before the UAAP's first expansion, teams would play a single round robin where the team with the best record would be crowned champions. If two or more teams are tied, they would be declared co-champions. No quotient system or knockout games were used to break ties.

First expansion format
Teams play a double round robin. The winner of the first round play the winner of the second round in a 1-game championship to determine the champion. Ties for round winners are broken by knockout games.

If a team wins both rounds, it is automatically declared the champion, regardless if it was a sweep or not. If a team fails to win either rounds, but ends up with a better over-all record than either of the round winners, that team will challenge the second round winner for a championship slot against the first round winner.

Second and third expansion format
Teams play a double round robin. The top two teams (over-all record) after the double round robin play in the Finals with the #1 seed holding a twice-to-beat advantage. If a team sweeps the double round robin, they are automatically declared champions.

Final four format

The tournament currently uses the Final Four format, first implemented in 1993. The Tournament begins with a double round-robin elimination, where a team plays the other teams twice to determine which teams will qualify to the semi-finals (also called Final Four). The top four finishers enter the Final Four phase.

Sweeper's advantage
Previously, if a team sweeps the double round robin, they are automatically declared champions. However, after UST's sweep in 1993, it was modified so that the sweeping team would automatically qualify to the best-of-three Finals. After UE swept their way to the Finals in 2007, it was again modified so that the sweeping team would now automatically qualify to a best-of-five Finals, holding a 1–0 game advantage.

Regular final four
If no team sweeps the double round eliminations, the four top teams (and tiebreakers, if applicable) qualify for the regular postseason.

The regular post-season is divided into the semi-finals (also called Final Four) and the Finals. In the semi-Finals, the two top seeds (#1 & #2) have a twice-to-beat advantage against the lower seeds (#3 & #4).

The surviving teams face off in a best-of-three finals, where the team which notches two wins first wins the championship.

Step ladder final four
From 2008 to 2015, if a team wins all of the games in the group stage, the step ladder format is used, where the unbeaten team has a bye up to the best-of-5 finals holding a 1–0 game advantage. The third and fourth seed will figure in a knockout game; the winner of that game will face the second seed with a twice-to-win disadvantage. The surviving team meets the first seed at the Finals. The format was modified in 2016, where the unbeaten team proceeds to the best-of-3 finals without any playoff advantage, but the knockout games in all of the three semifinal seeds remain in place.

List of basketball champions

Early years
The foundation of the UAAP by FEU, NU, UP and UST on 1938.

First expansion
Adamson University, Manila Central University, University of Manila and University of the East were admitted in 1952 on a two-year probationary membership status. Only UE and MCU retained as permanent member. However, MCU pulled-out in 1962. Adamson was readmitted into the association in 1970.

Second expansion
Ateneo was accepted as a member in 1978.

Third expansion
La Salle was accepted as a member in 1986.

Final Four era

Introduction of the Final Four format.

Inclusivity era 
In line with the association's commitment for inclusiveness, the tournament for girls' division was introduced.

 Notes

Number of championships by school
Championships won when a tournament was a demonstration sport are not included.

Notes

Statistics
 Longest finals appearances

 Longest finals match-ups between two teams

 Longest championship streaks

 Longest unshared championship streaks

 Longest championship droughts

 Elimination sweeps

The first ever sweep in UAAP basketball history was recorded by the FEU Tamaraws in 1980.

Championship streaks

Notes

a. UE Red Warriors own the longest championship run in Seniors Basketball, with seven straight championships (including a shared title), from 1965 to 1971. 
b. Includes the 2004 championship, where De La Salle forfeited the championship due to the fielding of ineligible players.
c. Includes the disputed 1991 championship where De La Salle did not show-up in the replay of Game 1.

Final Four records

* Does not include 6 seasons (1997–98, 1999–2000, 2006–07, 2010–11, 2014–15 and 2017–18) where Ateneo swept the group stage and automatically advanced to the Finals.
^ Does not include 2 seasons (2013–14 and 2015–16) where NU swept the group stage and automatically advanced to the Finals.

Most Valuable Players

Notes:
a. 2021-22 season was played in early 2022.

Finals MVP

Notes:
a. 2021-22 season was played in early 2022.

Rookie of the Year
Prior to 2005, all players playing in their first year (including transfers and those elevated from "team B") are eligible for the award. In 2005, the rule covering the seniors division was changed. Only fresh high school graduates are eligible.

Notes:
a. 2021-22 season was played in early 2022.

Facts and trivia

Last championship

Men's Division:
Ateneo Blue Eagles: 2022 
UP Fighting Maroons: 2021
De La Salle Green Archers: 2016
FEU Tamaraws: 2015
NU Bulldogs: 2014
UST Growling Tigers: 2006
UE Red Warriors: 1985
Adamson Falcons: 1977

Juniors' Division:
FEU Baby Tamaraws: 2022 
NU Bullpups: 2020
Ateneo Blue Eaglets: 2018
La Salle Junior Archers: 2007
UPIS Junior Maroons: 2002
UST Tiger Cubs: 2001
Adamson Baby Falcons: 1993
UE Junior Red Warriors: 1981

Women's Division:
NU Lady Bulldogs: 2022
La Salle Lady Archers: 2013
FEU Lady Tamaraws: 2012
Adamson Lady Falcons: 2010
Ateneo Lady Eagles: 2007
UST Tigresses: 2006
UP Lady Maroons: 1983
UE Lady Warriors: –

Last finals appearance:

Men's Division:
Ateneo Blue Eagles: 2022 (def. UP)
UP Fighting Maroons: 2022 (def. by Ateneo)
UST Growling Tigers: 2019 (def. by Ateneo)
La Salle Green Archers: 2017 (def. by Ateneo)
FEU Tamaraws: 2015 (def. UST)
NU Bulldogs: 2014 (def. FEU)
UE Red Warriors: 2009 (def. by Ateneo)
Adamson Falcons: 1993 (def. by UST)
MCU Tigers: 1958 (def. by UE)

Juniors' Division:
FEU Baby Tamaraws: 2022 (def. Adamson)
Adamson Baby Falcons: 2022 (def. by FEU) 
NU Bullpups: 2020 (def. FEU)
Ateneo Blue Eaglets: 2019 (def. by NU)
La Salle Junior Archers: 2015 (def. by NU)
UST Tiger Cubs: 2010 (def. by Ateneo)
UPIS Junior Maroons: 2005 (def. by La Salle)
UE Red Pages: 1986 (def. by Ateneo)

Women's Division:
NU Lady Bulldogs: 2022 (def. La Salle)
UST Tigresses: 2019 (def. by NU)
FEU Lady Tamaraws: 2018 (def. by NU)
UE Lady Warriors: 2017 (def. by NU)
La Salle Lady Archers: 2022 (def. by NU)
Ateneo Lady Eagles: 2015 (def. by NU)
Adamson Lady Falcons: 2011 (def. by FEU)
UP Lady Maroons: 2008 (def. by FEU)

Championship streaks:
The UE Red Warriors owns the longest championship run in UAAP seniors' basketball, with seven straight championships (including a shared title), from 1965 to 1971.
The University of Santo Tomas won the juniors', women's and men's championship in the 1994–95 season, the only instance where the three championships were won by a school in one school year.
De La Salle University won both the men's and women's basketball championships in the 1999, 2000, 2001 and 2013 seasons, making them the first school to win three consecutive double championships in the seniors' division tournament.
The Ateneo de Manila University won the juniors' and men's championships in 2008 and 2009, making them the first school to score a back-to-back double championships in men's and juniors divisions. The following year 2010, Ateneo won the titles in both divisions again, making them the first school to win a three-peat double championship.
The NU Lady Bulldogs owns the longest championship run in UAAP women's basketball, with seven straight championships from Seasons 77 to 85. They also hold the record for the longest winning streak by any team in any sport in the UAAP, at 108 games (6 consecutive 16-game season sweeps from Season 77 to Season 82 + no tournament in Seasons 83 and 84 + all first 12 games of the eliminations in UAAP Season 85), and the first team in the league's history to win at least 100 consecutive games.
The Ateneo de Manila University won the men's championships in seasons 80, 81 and 82, making them the first school in UAAP history to win a 3-peat championship multiple times in the Final Four era. They are also the first men's basketball team to win all of their games in one season in the Final Four era, and has the longest winning streak in UAAP men's basketball history, at 39 games (10 from 2nd round of the eliminations to Finals in Season 81 + 16 for the entire season in Season 82 + no tournament in Season 83 + 13 in all first 13 games of the eliminations in Season 84).

See also
 NCAA Basketball Championship (Philippines)

References

External links
Official UAAP Basketball News
The UAAP: A Historical Account

 
College men's basketball competitions in the Philippines
College women's basketball competitions in the Philippines
Basketball